This is a list of notable events in the history of LGBT rights that took place in the year 1990.

Events
 Reunification of West and East Germany — reunification treaty has an article to prevent West Germany's higher age of consent for sex between men taking effect in the former East Germany.
 San Diego, California, prohibits employment discrimination based on sexual orientation in the private sector.

February 
 2 — The United States Court of Appeals for the Ninth Circuit in High Tech Gays v. Defense Industrial Security Clearance Office uses rational basis review and rules that the federal government can deny security clearances to homosexuals.

March 
 Queer Nation, a direct action group is founded in New York City by activists from the AIDS Coalition to Unleash Power (ACT UP).

May 
 10 — Direct action group OutRage! is formed in the United Kingdom

October 
 27 — The U.S. Congress repeals a law prohibiting gays from being admitted into the country.

November 
 6
 Voters in Seattle, Washington, reject Initiative 35, which would have repealed an ordinance granting domestic partnership rights for medical leave and bereavement leave.
 By a margin of two to one, voters in Tacoma, Washington, reject a ballot initiative which would have reinstated a gay civil rights law repealed by voters in November 1989.
 Deborah Glick becomes the first openly gay or lesbian individual elected to the legislature of the U.S. state of New York.

December 
 10 — Colorado Governor Roy Romer issues an executive order prohibiting sexual orientation discrimination in the public sector.
 17 — Connecticut state legislator Joseph Grabarz comes out, becoming the state's first openly gay state legislator.

See also

Timeline of LGBT history — timeline of events from 12,000 BCE to present
LGBT rights by country or territory — current legal status around the world
LGBT social movements

References

LGBT rights by year
1990 in LGBT history